George Fox was a politician in Queensland, Australia. He was a Member of the Queensland Legislative Assembly.

Life 

George Fox was born in 1835 at Croydon, Surrey, England and died in office in Queensland 27 January 1914.  Details on George Fox MLA death are available.

Politics 
He represented the electoral district of Electoral district of Normanby (Queensland) from 19 Apr 1877 to 27 Jan 1914.

A further obituary from the Telegraph, Brisbane, Tuesday 27 January 1914.

Family 
He had three sons and one daughter.

References

Members of the Queensland Legislative Assembly
1835 births
1914 deaths
People from Queensland